Mood Indigo, affectionately known as MoodI or MI, is the cultural and signature festival of Indian Institute of Technology Bombay. It is usually held towards the end of December every year. Started in 1971 by a group of students, it has attracted considerable media attention and numerous sponsors over time. Mood Indigo is also held in over 2000+ colleges and universities before ending in IIT Bombay.

History
A group of the first Mood Indigo organizers - gave the festival its name from Duke Ellington's Jazz piece 'Mood Indigo'.  Mood Indigo had a legacy of organisers that include Nandan Nilekani, Anand Sivakumaran among others.

Mood Indigo was started back in 1971, with a budget of  5,000, contributed partly by the IIT Bombay Gymkhana and partly by advertisements. The 1981 edition of MI saw the widely celebrated duo of music stalwarts Asha Bhosle and R D Burman perform at the Indian Music Night. Classical Concerts, Rock Shows, Bonfires, and Jamming that went on till dawn were amongst the other highlights of MI'81.

From a sponsorship of around 5 lakhs in 1993, Mood Indigo had grown to have a budget of around 24 lakh INR in 1997. In 1998, Indian classical music aficionados got to listen to the likes of Pandit Shivkumar Sharma and Ustad Zakir Hussain. Amongst other events that took place were a workshop by Annu Kapoor and by eminent cartoonists like Unny and Sabu and a pyrotechnics display.

Mood Indigo 2008 saw the first international night in the form of an Ensiferum concert. In 2009, the band Porcupine Tree came to India for the first time to perform at MI. It also had performances by Parikrama, Alms for Shanti and concerts by the trio of Shankar–Ehsaan–Loy and Manna Dey. This edition also showcased Victor Rubilar, French band Moriarty and Swedish performer Meja. Other highlights included the sand sculptor Sudarshan Patnaik and the social drive of Khoon Chala.

In 2010, MI saw India's first ever Sumo Wrestling match, between three-time world sumo champion Byambajav Ulambayar and former world champion Naranbat Gankhuyag. Swedish metal band Katatonia had its first Asian performance in MI, and Livewire went national. Apart from them, MI 2010 also witnessed performances by Asha Bhosle, Indus Creed, Amit Trivedi as well as interactive sessions with Ramchandra Guha and a Harley Davidson Bike exhibition. The International Music Festival had the Indo-German rock band Fire On Dawson, French percussionist Minino Garay, Glass harp musicians Glass Duo and the fusion band KarmetiK.

Karnivool, the Australian progressive rock band performed in India for the first time at Mood Indigo 2011. The festival also witnessed concerts by Agnee, Raghu Dixit and KK while Worldfest was initiated. MI '11 also made into the Limca Book of Records for most number of international artists in a college festival. Other performances included Gamblerz and Gong Myoung from Korea. The 2012 Mood Indigo promoted tribal culture and tribal practices and included a social initiative called 'Hakuna Matata -Spread a Smile'. Simple Plan, the Canadian punk rock band headlined Mood Indigo, 2012.

The 2012 edition hosted India's first international carnival and Bollywood actors Anushka Sharma, Imran Khan, Arjun Rampal and Chitrangada Singh. The concerts saw performances by Pandit Vishwa Mohan Bhatt, Talavya, Karsh Kale collective and Salim–Sulaiman, and DJ Lloyd. Mood Indigo 2013, the "Oriental East", saw a unique display of 3000 Korean lanterns. Mike Portnoy performed alongside Neal Morse for the first time in Asia during this event. Mood Indigo 2014, themed "A Vintage Affair" featured installations including a vintage car, gramophones, typewriters, and cassette film art. Renowned EDM artist Sander Van Doorn, Dutch symphonic metal band Epica, Adnan Sami and Bollywood heartthrobs Vishal–Shekhar performed in the concerts at Mood Indigo 2014. In 2015, the theme being "A Hawaiian Escapade", the campus featured a 10-ft sand castle, tikkis, beachballs, and surfboards. New bars for entertainment were set with the hosting of a unique "Silent Disco"! 2016's Mood Indigo themed as "A Bombay Chronicle" gave the visitors a flavor of the city Mumbai through interactive installations. The events saw a line-up of artists like VINAI, Shankar–Ehsaan–Loy, Mame Khan, Sorabh Pant, Arjun Kanungo, Kumud Mishra, Zephyrtone and Crown the Empire. Mood Indigo 2017, "La Fete Carnaval" featured artists including Biswa Kalyan Rath, the Bassjackers, Akshay Kumar, P.Chidambaram, Amit Trivedi and Haken. The 2018 edition of Mood Indigo, themed as "A Montage of Dreams", continuing the legacy set by previous editions, also saw an amazing line-up of artists and bands perform in the festival, like  DJ MAG 23 Ummet Ozcan, Mithila Palkar, Leprous, Salim Merchant, Sulaiman Merchant, Papon, youth heartthrob Prateek Kuhad, Abhishek Upmanyu, Kunal Kamra, Smriti Irani, amongst others.

Due to the coronavirus pandemic, 2020 and 2021 editions were organised online as virtual events.

Events

Concerts
Concerts or "Pronites" feature national and international artists from various fields of music, like Rock, Sufi, Classical and Bollywood. Mood Indigo Pronites have staged international bands like Epica, the Neal Morse band featuring Mike Portnoy in 2013, Simple Plan in 2012, Karnivool in 2011, Katatonia in 2010, Porcupine Tree in 2009 and Ensiferumin 2008. Mood Indigo also played host to its first EDM concert with DJ Lange performing in 2013. This was followed by a concert featuring Sander van Doorn in 2014 and Borgeous in Mood Indigo 2015. Ummet Ozcan(DJ MAG 23) performed in the EDM Nite on Day 1 of Mood Indigo 2018.

Pronites has also hosted Asha Bhosle (once with music director R D Burman in 1981 and again in 2010), Jagjit Singh, Shankar–Ehsaan–Loy, Sonu Nigam, Shaan, Amit Trivedi, Kailash Kher, Salim–Sulaiman, Mohit Chauhan, Vishal–Shekhar, Pritam, Adnan Sami, Raghu Dixit, KK, Lucky Ali, Amit Kumar, Kavita Seth, Pankaj Udhas, Raghav Sachar, Agnee- the band and Javed Ali. Classical artists like Pt.Hari Prasad Chaurasia, Zakir Hussain, Pt. Bhimsen Joshi, Pt.Jasraj, Pt. Shiv Kumar Sharma, Pt. Vikku Vinayakram, Pt. Rajan and Sajan Mishra, sitar maestro Ustad Amjad Ali Khan and his sons Ayaan and Amaan Ali Bangash, Pt. Vishwa Mohan Bhatt, Manna Dey and Taufiq Qureshi have performed here as well.

Fusion artists including Louis Banks, Niladri Kumar, Sivamani and Alms for Shanti have performed in the past at Mood Indigo. Pronites also organizes Livewire, a rock band competition and has been a launchpad for bands Parikrama, Zero, Vayu. Headliner events in the past have included Motherjane, Indus Creed and Sceptre. In 2012 over 200 bands from across the country participated in the competition, with preliminary rounds being held in Mumbai, Delhi, Bangalore and Kolkata.

Mood Indigo has also hosted a number of Indian rock and fusion bands like Indus Creed, Euphoria, Indian Ocean, Motherjane, Parikrama, Thermal and a Quarter, Sceptre, Antaragni and Zero, and international bands like Canadian band Q.E.D.

Competitions

Competitions at Mood Indigo have been the stage for college contingents from across the country. Competitions cover all the genres of art - Dramatics, Lifestyle, Literary arts, Speaking arts Fine arts, Visual arts, Film & Media, Music, Dance and journalism.

These competitions have had personalities associated with them over the years. Finalists of the dance competition 'Dancing with the Stars' performed for an audience of 3500 and were judged by Shahid Kapoor and Rajiv Surty. The finalists of the music event 'Singing with the Stars' were judged by singers Kavita Seth, Meiyang Chang and Shibani Kashyap. Over 50 bands perform in Mantra, the Hindi band competition, for an audience of over 8000. The Western acoustic band competition sees the participation of over 50 bands from all over India. Aagaaz the street play competition, in its third edition, in Mood Indigo 2012, gave the winners getting a chance to perform at the National Center for Performing Arts.

The performing arts competition (One Act) called 'Third Bell' has had judges including Anupam Kher, Himani Shivpuri, Shobha Khote, Amit Behl, Piyush Mishra and Lalit Parimoo. It consists of events like Situational acting, Narrative Mime, Stand-Up comedy and Short Skit. The winners of this competition are also given a chance to perform at the National Center of Performing Arts. Its stage has played host to Amjad Khan and Mani Ratnam. Speaking events include Jam and Extempore, for informal speaking and National Debate for formal debates. Omniscience, the quizzing competition of the festival has quizzing events based on Entertainment, General Awareness, Business and Sports. In 2012, Omniscience had preliminary rounds in Kolkata, Pune, Delhi and Mumbai. Fine arts and Creatives include events and workshops such as 3-D surfacing, soap carving, vegetable carving, sponge modelling, painting on a canvas, book cover designing, Rangoli art, wax carving and charcoal drawing etc. In 2012, the filmmaking event, 'Director's cut' saw the director of the top two entries being given a chance to produce a short film each with Bejoy Nambiar along with best 2 actors of the top two movies with a professional crew. In 2013, the winners of the SGTL event received a direct entry into the Femina Miss India eliminations and won a photo shoot with Dabboo Ratnani. In 2010, a book cover design competition was organized in association with author Anita Nair. In 2015, the Hindi Poetry event was judged by Swanand Kirkire and MI Idol, the singing competition was judged by Papon.
Each year Mood indigo hosts competition phase in different colleges.
List of colleges in which mood indigo for competition was held(1973-2017) :-
•IIT Bombay - From 1973 to 2006
•IIT Delhi - 2007
•IIT Kharagpur - 2008
•NIT Trichy - 2009
•BITS Pilani - 2010
•NIFT Delhi - 2011
•IIT Roorkee - 2012
•BITS Hydrabad - 2013
•VIT Vellore - 2014
•IIT Bombay - Again from 2015 to 2017

Horizons

Horizons debuted in 1989, as a set of workshops and lectures on the Arts, as an experiment.  Its success has made it a permanent fixture on the calendar.

In 2012, Mood Indigo hosted more than 150 foreign artists from all over the world. It includes Canadian comedian Michel Lauzière, Irish sword swallower Murray Molloy, American fire artist Jason Divad, Monsieur Gusto, The Chancy Brothers, Wacky Chad and others.

International Music Festival (IMF) 

The International Music Festival, started in 2009, has brought to MI performers like the French group Moriarty, Fire On Dawson from Germany, Norwegian band Indian Core, Tarq Bowen from UK, Swedish performer Meja and the Glass Duo from Poland. Mood Indigo 2011 saw bands like Akasha from Malaysia and Caladh Nua from Ireland perform while the other shows included a performance by Gamblerz crew from South Korea and Jean Francois from Las Vegas. Vogue, the fashion competition has also been associated with prestigious names like Wendell Rodricks, Neeta Lulla, Marc Robinson, Kulraj Randhawa. 2010 also saw sumo wrestling at Mood Indigo.

Talent Fiesta 
Other shows include the Korean break dance troupe B-boyz, circus performance by Europe's Nofit State Circus, Tararam Israeli trash band that performed at the Athens Olympics, Adam Winrich the whip-cracker, Sabri brothers other renowned artists. Horizons has also hosted Victor Rubilar, street magician Chris Korn, Cile the one-man-band, magic show by P C Sorcar, Sudarshan Patnaik’s sand sculptures, Hasya Kavi Sammelan, puppetry show, synchronized swimming and diving, and Film Fest.

It also includes exhibitions of gramophones, photographs, famous newspaper archives and others. In 2010 an exhibition cum stunt show of the Harley Davidson bikes was organized. Workshops conducted range from theater, jazz, waltz, salsa, belly dancing, star gazing, kickboxing, lasso twirling, photography, latte art to eating with chopsticks.

Fringe events by artists from various countries such as Israel, Canada, Korea, United States are also part of the festival. These include drum circle, circus performers, jugglers, mime artists. The 2015 edition also included performances from the critically acclaimed Manganiyar Classroom, and Grammy winning musician Dhruba Ghosh.

Litfest 

The LitFest is an event where speakers hold panel discussions and interact with students. It has played host to panelists and speakers like Smriti Irani, Kiran Bedi, Prakash Jha, Rakeysh Omprakash Mehra, Shankar Mahadevan, Mahesh Bhatt, Pankaj Pachauri, Ramachandra Guha, Rohit Shetty. The 2013 edition of Illuminati featured talks by Aamir Khan, LinkedIn CEO Nishant Rao, S. Hussain Zaidi, Mir Ranjan Negi. In 2014, it featured talks by Amish Tripathi, Rajdeep Sardesai and Subramanian Swamy. In 2015, LitFest hosted Shashi Tharoor and Markandey Katju. 'Bollywood Panel' had directors from the Indian film industry like Ramesh Sippy, Anurag Kashyap and Rajkumar Hirani. "Eloquence", an event in LitFest saw an interview session of Devendra Fadnavis, the chief minister of the state of Maharashtra by journalist Arnab Goswami. 2017 featured P.Chidambaram, Anurag Kashyap, Manoj Bajpayee and other speakers.

Worldfest 
Worldfest is an initiative to bring together folk dance troupes from the world. International groups visiting Worldfest conduct workshops to facilitate cultural exchange, participate in sightseeing tours, parties and journeys to various points in the host city of Mumbai. Worldfest 2011 brought together groups from Spain, Turkey, Poland and Indonesia to perform on a single platform to showcase their country's rich cultural heritage. In 2012, Italy, Japan, Romania, Serbia and Sri Lanka exhibited their culture and food. Representatives from these countries also participated in the Carnival.

Humourfest 
Humourfest is an initiative to encourage the phenomenal growth of stand-comedy in India and abroad.  It has played host to comedians like Sorabh pant, Raju Srivastava, Sunil Pal, Mallika Dua, Biswa Kalyan rath, Sumaira Sheikh and Nishant Talwar. In 2018, Performers included Abhishek Upmanyu, Kunal Kamra, Kunal Chauhan and RJ Naved

Informals, Streets & Lounges
Informals refer to unconventional and spontaneous events. A major part of Informals is the Adventure Zone. It includes activities such as Zorbing, Paintball, Quad Biking, Hot air ballooning, Water Games, Laser Tag, Sumo Suit Wrestling etc. Other events organised include Baraat Dance, Street Races and Treasure Hunt. Games such as Snooker Pool Table and Board Games as well as Crime Scene Investigation, Role Playing Games are organized. In 2013, Dragon Boat Racing, a maritime event, was held at Marine Drive. "GRIND", a music event conducted saw the performance of Romanian pop act Akcent. 'She's Got The Look', the beauty pageant is also organized. A 4 km cross-country race and a 3x3 Basketball game are among other events.

The jury for personality hunts like "Mood Indigo’s Most Wackiest" and "Am I Talented?" has featured Gul Panag, Purab Kohli, Pallavi Joshi, Sandeepa Dhar, Tanisha, RJ Mallishka. Film actors Imran Khan and Anushka Sharma, playback singer and actress Monali Thakur were present at the "Mr. & Ms. Mood Indigo" in 2012 and 2013 respectively. Ayushmann Khurrana was a part of the jury for "Mr & Ms. Mood Indigo 2014".

Social Cause

As a part of the festival, a social cause is taken up every year to raise awareness in general public about a particular issue faced by the society.

See Through My Eyes (2018)
The campaign was planned to raise awareness about blindness and sensitization of people towards the blind, as well as encouraging accessibility.

Swab to Save (2017)
A nationwide stem cell donation drive was taken up the volunteers of Mood Indigo to increase the donor registry for combating diseases like Cancer. The marathon organised in the campus to raise awareness about the cause saw a magnificent turn out.

Rethink Pink(2016)
To remove the taboo attached to breast cancer, the students joined hands to break myths regarding the disease, to make the nation aware through interactive social campaigns.

Platelet Donation (2013)
Platelet do it! - was one of the most successful nationwide awareness campaigns under which a total of 30,000 students volunteered to register as platelet donors from over 1900 colleges across the nation.

Thalassemia (2012)

To spread awareness about thalassemia, a social cause campaign was launched in Mood Indigo 2012. Thalassemia testing camps were set up in various locations and colleges, and about 1400 people were tested . Report 1Report 2

Sparsh (2011)
Tying up with the Make A Difference NGO, the Mood Indigo core committee launched Sparsh for betterment of underprivileged children through campaigns and awareness drives. The organizers went to slums and interacted with slum children, understanding and trying to solve their problems.

Aagaaz (2010)

Aagaaz ("The beginning") was a countrywide social awareness campaign through street plays. The campaign aimed on raising awareness on issues like oppressed child workers, status of women in the society and corruption.

Khoon Chala (2008 - 2009)
Khoon Chala was the Mood Indigo blood donation drive, started in 2008. ' To also spread the awareness about blood donation, street plays were organised, and short films were screened in 30 colleges and 7 cineplexes respectively. In the two editions of MI when the donation drive was held, more than 2500 units of blood were collected.

Sponsors, media and publicity

Mood Indigo has attracted sponsorships from various corporations due to significant participation of students from all over India. Brands having sponsored Mood Indigo in the past include One Plus, Nivea, Tata Photon, Oreo, LinkedIn, Tata Docomo, Colgate, Parle, State Bank of India, Canara Bank, Pepsi, Coca-Cola, WWE, MTV, PVR, Inox, Fame, Levi's, Reliance, Nokia, BlackBerry, Cisco, Pantaloons Femina, Maybelline, McDonald's, Domino's Pizza, Subway (restaurant), Limca Book of Records, Go-Jiyo, Braingain Magazine. Cadbury owned biscuit brand, Oreo, set a new Guinness World Record at Mood Indigo 2013 where all of 1,796 people simultaneously consumed Oreo biscuits in the brand's signature 'Twist, Lick, Dunk' style, breaking the previous record set by 1,503 people in Argentina.

Mood Indigo is one of the most widely publicised and covered college festival in India, receiving extensive coverage by all sectors of media. In print media leading newspapers like The Times of India, Hindustan Times, Indian Express, DNA, The Economic Times and also several local dailies cover Mood Indigo throughout the year. In electronic media, Mood Indigo is covered by Red Fm, Radio Mirchi and prominent TV networks like 9X Media, MTV India and Sony Mix. Over the years festival has been covered in several youth centric shows like MTV Wassup!, UTV Campus Attack.  Some of the popular events covered on television were Sumo Wrestling On ESPN and Sahara, Livewire by ZEE Music and Shahid Kapoor by NDTV. Through DSN media Mood Indigo's advertisements were shown throughout the country.
In 2010, footage of Amit Trivedi’s Mood Indigo 2010 concert was used in the DVD edition of Udaan (2010 film).

References

External links

Moodi.org - Official website
Mood Indigo, IIT Bombay - Facebook Page
Twitter

IIT Bombay
Culfests
Indian Institutes of Technology festivals
Festivals established in 1973
Cultural festivals in India
1973 establishments in Maharashtra